Hypophytala vansomereni is a butterfly in the family Lycaenidae. It is found in the Democratic Republic of the Congo, western Uganda and north-western Tanzania. The habitat consists of forests.

References

Butterflies described in 1964
Poritiinae